Connecticut's 140th House district is one of 151 Connecticut House of Representatives districts. It is currently represented by Travis Simms. The district consists of the central part of the city of Norwalk.

List of representatives
Prior to redistricting in 1972, Otha Brown Jr. represented the 148th District and John Fabrizio represented the 147th. The redistricting formed the 140th from the old 148th, 147th and part of the 145th District. This forced a contest between the two incumbents. Brown was defeated by Fabrizio in the November 1972 election.

Recent elections

2002

2004

2006

2008

2010

2012

2020

2022

See also 
 List of members of the Connecticut General Assembly from Norwalk

References

External links 
 Connecticut House District Map

140
Norwalk, Connecticut